Terzan 1 also known as ESO 455-23 and Terzan 1966, is a heavily obscured globular cluster located around 20.000 light-years from Earth in the constellation of Scorpius. 

It is one of about 150 globular clusters discovered by the French astronomer Agop Terzan in the 1960s-70s, belonging to the Milky Way. Terzan 1 is also an X-ray source.

Terzan 1 has the smallest projected distance to the Milky Way’s center among all known globulars: is only 4,200 light-years from the center but 21,800 light-years from Earth.

In 1980, astronomers detected X-ray bursts from a source located in Terzan 1. Several years later, the source X1732-304 was detected within the cluster with NASA’s Spacelab 2 and ESA’s EXOSAT missions.

References

Globular clusters
Scorpius (constellation)